Shouting and Pointing is a 1976 album by British band Mott. It was the second and final album by the group.

Despite favourable nods by critics in the music press, Shouting and Pointing was the only Mott album to not chart at all in either the U.S. or U.K. Following that disappointment, the band was dropped by CBS records. Singer Benjamin left, to be replaced by ex-Medicine Head band singer/guitarist John Fiddler, and the band changed their name to British Lions, just one year after the release of this album. Retrospective reception to the album is now negative.

Track listing

Side one
 "Shouting and Pointing" (Morgan Fisher, Pete Overend Watts) – 4:31
 "Collision Course" (Watts) – 3:25
 "Storm" (Fisher, Ray Major, Watts) – 5:31
 "Career (No Such Thing as Rock 'n' Roll)" (Nigel Benjamin, Fisher) – 5:26

Side two
 "Hold on, You're Crazy" (Watts) – 4:31
 "See You Again" (Watts) – 4:22
 "Too Short Arms (I Don't Care)" (Fisher, Major) – 4:00 
 "Broadside Outcasts" (Fisher, Watts) – 3:18
 "Good Times" (Harry Vanda, George Young) – 3:57

Personnel

Mott
 Nigel Benjamin – lead vocals, rhythm and acoustic guitars
 Ray Major –  lead and slide guitars, backing vocals
 Morgan Fisher – piano, backing vocals, organ, synthesizer
 Pete Overend Watts – bass, backing vocals
 Dale "Buffin" Griffin – drums, backing vocals, percussion

Technical
 Mott – producer, arranger
 Eddie Kramer – producer, engineer
 Mick "The Mint" Glossop – engineer
 Bill Price, Ric Stokes – mastering
 Roslav Szaybo – design
 Alan Messer, Dale Griffin, Gered Mankowitz – photography

References

External links
Shouting and Pointing review
Shouting and Pointingat Discogs
Shouting and Pointing at Allmusic

Mott the Hoople albums
1976 albums
Albums produced by Eddie Kramer
Columbia Records albums